Stefan Hantel, better known by his stage name Shantel (born 2 March 1968), is a German DJ and producer based in Frankfurt. He is known for his work with Romani brass orchestras, DJing and remixing traditional Balkan music with electronic beats.

Background and early life
Shantel is of Greek descent on his paternal side. His maternal grandparents were Ukrainian Jews from Chernivtsi.

Career
Shantel began his DJ career in Frankfurt, Germany, and was inspired by the audience reaction to Romani brass bands such as Fanfare Ciocărlia and trumpeter Boban Marković to infuse electronically tweaked Balkan Romani music into his DJ set. Shantel released two compilations of his popular DJ night, Bucovina Club, on his own Essay label, which won the Club Global award in the 2006 BBC Radio 3 Awards for World Music. He was one of several DJs to remix recordings of Taraf de Haïdouks and Kočani Orkestar on the Electric Gypsyland compilations from Belgium's Crammed Discs label, and released his next album on that label. He gained popularity in Turkey after recording the clip of 'Disko Partizani' in Istanbul. Shantel's 2007 album Disko Partizani departed somewhat from the techno sound of Bucovina Club, concentrating more on the music's Balkan roots. The album was awarded Platinum award in Turkey by Mü-Yap in 2008 and 2009. In 2011 he released an album with Oz Almog named Kosher Nostra Jewish Gangsters Greatest Hits. This album is a wild mix of Swing, Jazz, Twist, Charleston and Yiddish songs and Ballads.

Discography

 Super Mandarine (1994)
 Club Guerilla (1995)
 Auto Jumps & Remixes (1997)
 EP (1997)
 No. 2 (1997)
 "II" EP (1998)
 Higher than the Funk (1998)
 Oh So Lovely EP (1998)
 Oh So Lovely Remixes (1998)
 Backwood (2001)
 Great Delay (2001)
 Inside (2001)
 Bucovina (2003)
 Disko (2003)
 Bucovina Club Vol. 2 (2005)
 Gypsy Beats and Balkan Bangers (2006)
 Disko Partizani (2007)
 Disko Partizani Remixes (2008)
 Planet Paprika (2009)
 Kosher Nostra Jewish Gangsters Greatest Hits  (2011)
 Anarchy + Romance  (2013)
 Viva Diaspora  (11th of Sept. 2015)

References

External links 

 
 Shantel on MSN Music
 Shantel page on the Crammed Discs website

1968 births
Living people
German DJs
Folk-pop singers
German people of Ukrainian-Jewish descent
German people of Greek descent
Musicians from Frankfurt
Electronic dance music DJs